The Murindó Fault is a strike-slip fault in the department of Antioquia and Chocó in northwestern Colombia.

Etymology 
The fault is named after Murindó.

Description 
The fault in the Chocó Basin extends along the western slope of the Western Ranges of the Colombian Andes, from the Arquia River in the south to the Río Sucio and the basin of the Atrato River in the north. The Murindó Fault places Cretaceous volcanic (basic) rocks against Tertiary turbidites, and crosscuts Tertiary quartz-diorite and granodiorite. The Murindó River flows along the Murindó Fault near Murindó. The fault underlies the municipalities of Dabeiba and Frontino. To the south, the fault runs parallel to the Mutatá and Encarnación Faults.

In the southernmost part, the fault shows evidence of tectonic control of streams. It also forms aligned saddles that face toward the mountain front. A foreshock of 6.7 was registered the day before. Many earthquakes that occurred since 1883 in the region are associated with the Murindó Fault.

See also 

 List of earthquakes in Colombia
 Unguía Fault
 Romeral Fault System

References

Bibliography

Maps

Further reading 
 

Seismic faults of Colombia
Strike-slip faults
Active faults
Faults
Faults
Earthquakes in Colombia